Derek Holland (born 14 January 1974 in Dublin) is an Irish rower and secondary school teacher. He reached fourth place at the 1996 Summer Olympics in the Men's Lightweight Coxless Fours.

Early life
Derek Holland was born on 14 January 1974 in Dublin in County Dublin, Ireland. Holland was introduced to rowing in 1987 aged around thirteen by his dad John Holland.

Rowing career

Olympic games
When Derek Holland was 22, he won 4th in the Lightweight Men's Four at the 1996 Olympic Games held in Atlanta, United States.

World Championships
In 1989, Holland was selected for the Irish Junior team at the 1989 World Rowing Junior Championships held in Szeged, Hungary, and won 4th in the junior eight sculls. Derek Holland also competed in the 1995 World Rowing Championships in Tampere, Finland, coming first in the Lightweight Men's Four. Holland also competed in the 1996 World Rowing Championships in Glasgow, Great Britain, coming third in the Lightweight Men's Eight. In 1998 Derek competed in the 1998 World Rowing Championships which took place in Cologne, Germany, he got silver in the Lightweight Men's Four.

World Rowing Cups
In 1997 Derek competed in the 1997 World Rowing Cup II which took place in Paris, France, he placed 6th in the Lightweight Men's Four.

Achievements
 World Championship medals: 4 gold, 6 silver, 5 bronze

Olympic Games
 1996 – 4th, Coxless Four (with Sam Lynch, Tony O'Connor)

World Rowing Championships

 2004 – Silver, Coxless Pair (with Neil Casey)
 2004 – 4th, Coxless Pair (with Neil Casey)
 2004 – 6th, Coxless Pair (with Neil Casey)
 2003 – Silver, Coxless Pair (with Neil Casey)
 2003 – Bronze, Coxless Pair (with Neil Casey)
 2003 – 5th, Coxless Pair (with Neil Casey)
 2002 – Gold, Coxless Four (with Neil Casey, Paul Griffin, Richard Archibald)
 2002 – Gold, Coxless Four (with Neil Casey, Paul Griffin, Richard Archibald)
 2002 – Silver, Coxless Four (with Neil Casey, Paul Griffin, Richard Archibald)
 2002 – 4th, Coxless Four (with Neil Casey, Paul Griffin, Richard Archibald)
 2001 – Silver, Coxless Four (with Neal Byrne, Owen Byrne, Noel Monahan)
 2001 – Bronze, Coxless Four (with Neal Byrne, Owen Byrne, Noel Monahan)
 2001 – 4th, Coxless Four (with Neal Byrne, Owen Byrne, Noel Monahan)
 2000 – Bronze, Coxless Four (with James Lindsay-Fynn, John Armstrong, Noel Monahan)
 2000 – 4th, Coxless Four (with James Lindsay-Fynn, John Armstrong, Noel Monahan)
 2000 – 5th, Coxless Four (with James Lindsay-Fynn, John Armstrong, Noel Monahan)
 2000 – 6th, Coxless Four (with James Lindsay-Fynn, John Armstrong, Noel Monahan)
 1999 – Gold, Coxless Pair (with Niall O'Toole)
 1999 – Silver, Coxless Pair (with Niall O'Toole)
 1999 – Bronze, Coxless Pair (with Niall O'Toole)
 1999 – 6th, Coxless Pair (with Niall O'Toole)
 1998 – Silver, Coxless Four (with Neville Maxwell, Tony O'Connor, Brendan Dolan)
 1996 – Bronze, Coxed Eight (with Sam Lynch, Peter Brady, Keith Flynn, Eoin Whelan, Adrian Smith, Paul Flannery, John Forde, Malachy McGlynn)
 1995 – Gold, Coxless Four (with Sam Lynch, Conor Moloney, Paul Flannery)

Junior World Rowing Championships
 1989 – Coxed Eight (with Angus Woods, Manus Crowley, Colm O'Rourke, Owen Diviney, Eugene McCarthy, Peter Collins, Brian Collins, Tom Colsh)

References 

1974 births
Living people
Irish male rowers
Sportspeople from Dublin (city)
Rowers at the 1996 Summer Olympics
Olympic rowers of Ireland
20th-century Irish people